Tyrone Washington (born 1944) is an American jazz tenor saxophonist.

Career 
Washington is known best for his 1967 debut album for Blue Note Records. He did not record after 1974 and Ken Dryden speculates "...his name doesn't show up in jazz encyclopedias, so one wonders if he died prematurely or quit music for some other reason", while Jason Sositko comments: "Not a whole heck of a lot is known about this fine tenor saxophonist, apparently he left the music world entirely for his religious faith..." According to an obituary for his mother, he was still alive as of August 3, 2022, having changed his name to Mohammad Bilal Abdullah and become a Sunni Muslim minister.

Discography

As leader
1967: Natural Essence with Woody Shaw, James Spaulding, Kenny Barron, Reggie Workman, Joe Chambers (Blue Note)
1968: Unreleased Session with Herbie Hancock, Herbie Lewis, Jack DeJohnette (Blue Note)
1973: Roots with Stafford James, Clifford Barbaro Barconadhi, Hubert Eaves III (Perception)
1974: Do Right with Hubert Eaves III, Billy Nichols, René McLean, Idris Muhammad) (Blue Labor)

As sideman
With Stanley Cowell
Brilliant Circles (Freedom, 1969)
With Roswell Rudd
Blown Bone (Philips, 1976)
With Horace Silver
The Jody Grind (Blue Note, 1966)
With Heiner Stadler
Brains on Fire (Labor, 1973)
'With Larry YoungContrasts'' (Blue Note, 1967)

References

External links
Tyrone Washington discography as a leader

1944 births
African-American saxophonists
American jazz tenor saxophonists
American male saxophonists
Hard bop saxophonists
Blue Note Records artists
Living people
21st-century American saxophonists
21st-century American male musicians
American male jazz musicians
21st-century African-American musicians
20th-century African-American people